Dark Days or Dark Day may refer to:

In film:
 Dark Day (1961 film), a South Korean film starring Kim Seung-ho
 Dark Days (film), a 2000 documentary by Marc Singer

In literature:
 Dark Days (comics), a comic book series by Steve Niles and Ben Templesmith
 Skulduggery Pleasant: Dark Days, a novel by Derek Landy
 Dark Days (Cheekati Rojulu), a novel by Ampasayya Naveen

In music:
 Dark Days (Coal Chamber album)
 Dark Days (The Ducky Boys album)
 Dark Days (Loaded album)
 Dark Day (Qwel & Maker album)
 Dark Day (Fred Anderson album)
 "Dark Days" (The Used song), a song by The Used
 Dark Day, a band led by Robin Crutchfield
 "Dark Days" (Parkway Drive song), a song by Parkway Drive
 "Dark Days" (Local Natives song), a song by Local Natives

Other:
 New England's Dark Day, May 19, 1780, when the sky over New England was enveloped in darkness

See also